Trichosanchezia is a genus of flowering plants belonging to the family Acanthaceae.

Its native range is Peru.

Species:
 Trichosanchezia chrysothrix Mildbr.

References

Acanthaceae
Acanthaceae genera
Taxa named by Johannes Mildbraed